Pitcher Mountain is a  2,153 feet (656 m) monadnock located in southwest New Hampshire. The mountain is traversed by the 50 mile (80 km) Monadnock-Sunapee Greenway and offers 360 degree views from its open summit. Lower elevations are wooded with species of the northern hardwood forest type; small stands of coniferous red spruce cling to the upper slopes. A fire tower stands on the summit and a beef livestock farm occupies the east shoulder of the mountain. Pitcher Mountain is part of an extensive area of heath barrens and blueberry fields that continue north over Hubbard Hill and Jackson Hill.

The east and north sides of Pitcher Mountain drain into the Beards Brook watershed, then into the Contoocook River, then the Merrimack River and the Atlantic Ocean. The west and south sides drain into Robinson Brook, thence Otter Brook, "The Branch", the Ashuelot River, then the Connecticut River and Long Island Sound.

References

 Monadnock-Sunapee Greenway Trail Guide, fifth edition (1994). Concord, New Hampshire: Society for the Protection of New Hampshire Forests.
 Delorme Topo 6.0 (2006). Mapping software. Yarmouth, Maine: DeLorme.

Mountains of Cheshire County, New Hampshire
Mountains of New Hampshire